Cypripedium guttatum, the spotted lady's slipper or Alaskan lady's slipper, is a species of orchid found on three continents. It is native to Belarus, Russia (European Russia, Siberia and Russian Far East) as well as China (Hebei, Heilongjiang, Jilin, Liaoning, Nei Mongol, Ningxia, Shaanxi, Shandong, Shanxi, Sichuan, Tibet, and Yunnan), Korea, Mongolia, Bhutan, Alaska (including the Aleutians) and northern Canada (Yukon and Northwest Territories). It grows in forests, thickets, and grassland.

References

External links 

 IOSPE orchid photos
 Rare Plants United Kingdom
 Orchideen im Garten

guttatum
Flora of Alaska
Orchids of Asia
Orchids of the United States
Orchids of Canada
Orchids of China
Orchids of Russia
Taxa named by Olof Swartz